The Men's 1 km time trial at the 2011 UCI Track Cycling World Championships was held on March 27. 21 athletes participated in the contest.

Results
The race was held at 13:30.

See also
2011 UCI Para-cycling Track World Championships – Men's 1 km time trial

References

2011 UCI Track Cycling World Championships
UCI Track Cycling World Championships – Men's 1 km time trial